is a Japanese adventure anime series created by Yasuji Mori and produced by Toei Animation. Its 26 episodes were aired on November 1, 1965, to April 25, 1966, on TV Asahi.

Plot
The plot involves the adventures of three friends, Punch (a bear), Touch (a mouse), and Bun (a weasel), who all live in a scrapyard by themselves. Each episode has the three main characters stop the evil plans of Professor Garigari, a wolf who wants to build his own city over their hometown, including the scrapyard.

Characters

 The titular main character. Punch is an orphan bear who is literally hard-headed, making it impossible for him to be hit on the head, much to his advantage. Punch also uses his head to break holes in walls, having to just run into the wall with his head in front and smash through. He may be the oldest of the trio as he is capable of driving a car and even an airplane (though it might attribute more to his size than age since he's also the tallest).

 A mouse who is really into fashion and jewelry. Because of her small size, she often sneaks in and out through small spaces, usually to help out Punch and Bun. She even uses her cute charms to get Nu to help her out, mostly whenever she is in Garigari's clutches.

 A weasel who uses a slingshot as a weapon, and is an expert shot. In the English-sub, he is identified as "Boom".

 The main antagonist. A wolf. He is a professional inventor who uses his devices to commit crimes such as robbing banks or making counterfeit money. His main goal is to wipe out the city in order to make his own town in honor of his ancestors. He first plans on getting rid of the scrapyard where Punch, Touch, and Bun live, which is why the kids make sure his plans always fail.
 Professor Garigari would later reappear a decade later as an antagonist in Toei's third Puss in Boots movie; 長靴をはいた猫 80日間世界一周 Nagagutsu o Haita Neko: Hachijū Nichi-kan Sekaiisshū (Puss in Boots: Around The World in 80 Days) released in 1976.

 A black cat who is one of Garigari's henchmen. He often carries around a pistol to threaten the orphans, but he always misses his targets due to his poor shooting skills. This often leads to Bun teasing him, which annoys him.
 While Black is very boastful and self-confident, when Garigari is around, he is easily frightened.

 Garigari's other henchmen who is a dimwitted pig. While Nu respects Black and follows Garigari's orders out of fear, sometimes he shows a soft side towards the orphans, especially Touch, who often flatters him into doing something for her and her friends.

Episode listing

Home media
The complete series was released on DVD on January 25, 2006. A digital remaster version in DVD Box sets were later released on February 26, 2016.

References

External links
 

1965 anime television series debuts
1965 Japanese television series debuts
1966 Japanese television series endings
Adventure anime and manga
Orphan characters in anime and manga
TV Asahi original programming
Toei Animation television
Animated television series about bears
Animated television series about mice and rats
Fictional weasels
Television series about wolves
Animated television series about orphans
Fictional hoboes